Meir Simcha of Dvinsk (1843–1926) was a rabbi and prominent leader of Orthodox Judaism in Eastern Europe in the early 20th century. He was a kohen, and is therefore often referred to as Meir Simcha ha-Kohen ("Meir Simcha the Kohen"). He is known for his writings on Maimonides' Mishneh Torah, which he titled Ohr Somayach, as well as his novellae on the Torah, titled Meshech Chochma.

Biography
Meir Simcha was born in Butrimonys, Lithuania, to Samson Kalonymus, a local wealthy merchant. According to family tradition, his later success in Torah study was attributed to two blessings his parents had received from local rabbis before his birth.

He received his education locally, and managed to evade the regular roundups of Jewish boys that were being held as a result of the Cantonist decrees that had been in effect since 1827.

After marrying in 1860, at age 17, he settled in Białystok, Poland, where he was supported by his wife, who opened a business to support him while he continued his Talmudic studies. After 27 years there he finally, after turning down many offers, accepted the rabbinate of the mitnagdim (non-Hasidic Jews) in the Latvian town of Dvinsk, now known as Daugavpils. He served in that position for 39 years until his death.

In Dvinsk, his counterpart was the Hasidic Rabbi Yosef Rosen, known as the Rogatchover Gaon or by his work Tzofnath Paneach. The two had a great respect for each other, despite Rosen's legendary fiery temper, and on occasions referred questions in Jewish law to each other. They also shared a love for the works of Maimonides.

In 1906, a certain Shlomo Friedlander claimed to have discovered and then published two tractates of the Jerusalem Talmud that had been considered to have been lost for hundreds of years. Rabbi Meir Simcha (as well as the Rogatchover Gaon, the Gerer Rebbe, Rabbi Moshe Shmuel Glasner of Klausenburg, the Dor Revi'i, and Rabbi Dr Yissachar Dov Ritter of Rotterdam) was one of the prominent rabbis who discovered that the work was a very clever forgery, and denounced it as such.

In Dvinsk, he received visitors from the whole region, and was frequently consulted on issues affecting the community at large, including Poland and Lithuania. He reputedly turned down offers for the rabbinate in various large cities, including Jerusalem, New York City and Kovno.

He died in a hotel in Riga while seeking medical treatment.

Family
Rabbi Meir Simcha of Dvinsk had one unmarried daughter with mental issues who predeceased him. He therefore has no living descendants. However, some say that his daughter actually married the great Rav Avrohom Luftvir. Both his son in law and daughter died young and are buried in Warsaw.
As a result of this, one of his most prominent students and a close friend, Rabbi Yisrael Avraham Abba Krieger, committed to carrying on his legacy.

Works
Ohr Somayach on Maimonides' Mishneh Torah.
Ohr Somayach on Talmudic tractates 'Bava Kama' and 'Bava Metzia'.
Ohr Somayach novellae on the Talmud.
Ohr Somayach responsa addressing many practical issues of halacha.
Meshech Chochma on Chumash.
Various treatises on parts of the Jerusalem Talmud.
Comments and insights on the Sefer haChinuch.

Ideas and influence
He opposed the non-religious Zionist groups, but was in favor of Religious Zionists. After the Balfour Declaration, he was of the opinion that the Three Oaths were no longer in effect. He was present at the founding meetings of Agudath Yisrael in the German town of Bad Homburg, but could not attend the first large conference in Katowice due to poor health. He had several clashes with some of his contemporaries, including Rabbi Yisrael Meir Kagan (the Chafetz Chaim) on political issues and questions of Jewish law.

It is harder to determine his exact stance in philosophical matters, although much can be gleaned from his Meshech Chochma (see below).

Bibliography

Rabbi Meir Simcha authored Ohr Somayach (or Ohr Sameiach) ("The delighted, or happy, light", a play on his name, possibly derived from Proverbs 13:9), a collection of novellae on Maimonides' Mishneh Torah. His approach is highly original, gathering material from the breadth of Jewish religious literature to approach difficult contradictions in Maimonides' main work of Jewish law. It was published during his lifetime and immediately became popular.

Other works, novellae on the Talmud and responsa, did not have the same impact but are still used for reference.

His main contribution to Jewish philosophy was to be posthumous. His pupil Menachem Mendel Zaks published Meshech Chochma ("The Price of Wisdom", Meshech is the acronym of Meir Simcha Kohen, and the words derive from Job 28:18), which contains novellae on the Torah, but very often branches off into questions of Jewish philosophy. He is often quoted as having predicted the Holocaust in a statement in this work: "They think that Berlin is Jerusalem...from there will come the storm winds that will uproot them".

Ohr Somayach yeshivas

In the late 1970s several baal teshuva yeshivas under Haredi Judaism auspices were founded and chose to honor the memory of Rabbi Meir Simcha of Dvinsk by calling themselves by his pen name for his work "Ohr Somayach". The first was the yeshiva Ohr Somayach, Jerusalem in Israel, and another was Ohr Somayach, Monsey in the United States. Other branches were established in Toronto and Montreal in Canada, and in Detroit, Los Angeles, and Philadelphia. Worldwide, branches, all bearing the name Ohr Somayach, are Ohr Somayach, South Africa, London in the United Kingdom, Kiev in the Ukraine, and Sydney in Australia.

References

Further reading
 

1843 births
1926 deaths
Bible commentators
Haredi rabbis in Europe
Kohanim writers of Rabbinic literature
19th-century rabbis from the Russian Empire
Lithuanian Haredi rabbis
Writers from Daugavpils
20th-century Russian rabbis